Hylaeobatrachus is an extinct genus of prehistoric salamander, known from  the Early Cretaceous of Europe. The type species H. croyii is known from the Sainte-Barbe Clays Formation at the Iguanodon locality of Belgium, and was described by Louis Dollo. An unnamed Hylaeobatrachus-like taxon has also been reported  from Las Hoyas, Spain. Both localities are of Barremian age. Hylaeobatrachus belongs to the crown group of modern salamanders, though its exact relationship with modern salamander groups is uncertain. It was neotenic, llike some modern salamanders.

See also
 Prehistoric amphibian
 List of prehistoric amphibians

References

Cretaceous salamanders
Early Cretaceous amphibians
Fossils of Belgium
Fossils of Spain
La Huérguina Formation
Fossil taxa described in 1884
Taxa named by Louis Dollo